Phrantela is a genus of minute freshwater snails with an operculum, aquatic gastropod molluscs or micromolluscs in the family Hydrobiidae.

Species
Species within the genus Phrantela include:
 Phrantela annamurrayae
 Phrantela conica
 Phrantela kutikina
 Phrantela pupiformis
 Phrantela richardsoni
 Phrantela umbilicata

References

 Nomenclator Zoologicus info

 
Hydrobiidae
Taxonomy articles created by Polbot